Rockbridge Associates, Inc. is a market research firm located in Great Falls, Virginia that specializes in issues for technology and services companies and associations. Rockbridge offers services addressing business issues such as product development, customer satisfaction, segmentation, branding and pricing. The firm provides the National Technology Readiness Survey, which has tracked consumer technology beliefs since 1999. Rockbridge is a member of the Council of American Survey Research Organizations (CASRO).

History

Rockbridge Associates, Inc. was founded in 1992.  From its early years, the company was using the Internet as a research medium, and in the study of technology adoption, including work on development of the Technology Readiness IndexTechnology readiness.  The company was founded by Charles Colby, who had previously worked for the Opinion Research Corporation and Westat, Inc.  Charles co-authored the book Techno-ready Marketing with Dr. A. Parasuraman, has taught marketing management and market research at universities, and is a Senior Fellow in the University of Maryland, College Park's Center for Excellence in Service.

In 1996, Rockbridge became one of the first market research firms to launch a website.  In this year, Rockbridge began working with Professor Parasuraman(co-developer of SERVQUAL) on a project to study technology beliefs.

In 1997, Rockbridge began conducting online surveys.  It also launched an early web-based focus group platform, SurveyChat.

In the late 1990s, Rockbridge began conducting a series of pilot tests with corporate clients like American Online and Sallie Mae to perfect a Technology Readiness Index.

In 1999 Rockbridge Associates released the first annual National Technology Readiness Survey (NTRS), which was awarded top honors by the Cable & Telecommunications Association for Marketing (CTAM).

In 2000, Professor Parasuraman published his landmark paper on the Technology Readiness Index (TRI) in the Journal of Services Research based on collaboration with Rockbridge.  In the same year, Rockbridge began licensing the TRI for commercial use under the name Techqual, while granting free licenses to scholars around the world.  Rockbridge also became a partner in the Center for Excellence in Service at the University of Maryland, College Park's Robert H. Smith School of Business.

In 2001, Parasuraman and Colby published their book on consumer technology behavior, Techno-Ready Marketing: How and Why your Customers Adopt Technology.

In 2004, Rockbridge partnered with Dr. Tom Reynolds to implement a means-end methodology based on laddering interviews on the Internet.

By 2006, Rockbridge Associates was named as the official market research partner of the Consumer Electronics Association (CEA).  Rockbridge operated CEA's eBrain Market Research division until 2008.

Due to expertise in technology and communications industries, financial services, entertainment and travel, and association sectors, Rockbridge has been invited to speak at a variety of meetings and conferences. In 2008, Rockbridge shared its insights into the technology industry, speaking at the American Marketing Association's Frontiers in Services Conference and the Marketing Research Association's Annual Conference.

In 2008, Rockbridge introduced its Green Technology Index which measures receptiveness to innovative green behaviors and products.

In 2009, Rockbridge worked with Network Solutions and the University of Maryland, College Park to release the Small Business Success Index, which was featured on Fox News.

That same year, Rockbridge unveiled SafeSample, a methodology created to ensure online survey data quality.   In addition, it completed development on a research alternative to online communities called Opinion-Pond.

In 2012, Gina Woodall became the President of Rockbridge.  The Founder, Charles Colby, assumed the role of Chief Methodologist.

Awards

1999 Research Case Study Award Grand Winner by CTAM, the Cable & Telecommunications Association for Marketing. The award was presented for the development of the National Technology Readiness Survey (NTRS), which focuses on how and why consumers adopt various technologies.

NTRS study

The National Technology Readiness Survey (NTRS) is an annual study produced by Rockbridge Associates Inc. and the Center for Excellence in Service at the University of Maryland, College Park's Robert H. Smith School of Business senior fellows Charles Colby and A. Parasuraman, tracks beliefs about technology and key behaviors related to e-service.

References

External links
 Official Website
 National Technology Readiness Survey
 Center for Excellence in Service at the University of Maryland’s Robert H. Smith School of Business
 Techno-Ready Marketing

Market research companies of the United States
Companies based in Virginia
Research and analysis firms of the United States